Brownsboro is a rural unincorporated community in Oldham County, Kentucky, United States.  It is located northwest of Crestwood on KY 329.

References

Geography

Unincorporated communities in Oldham County, Kentucky
Unincorporated communities in Kentucky